Demirdjian, Demirdjyan (Տէմիրճյան), is a common surname in Armenia originating from the Turkish word 'Demir', meaning iron. In Turkish demirci (demir with the suffix -ci) means one who works with iron, therefore it can translate to the equivalent English surname 'Smith'. Demirdjian is the Armenized version of Demirci written in Latin script.

It can refer to the Armenian-American AGBU Manoogian-Demirdjian School in Los Angeles, California.

Armenian Script

Դեմիրճյան (Eastern Armenian)

or

Տէմիրճեան (Western Armenian)

See also

 John de Mirjian, 1920s glamour photographer

https://en.wikipedia.org/wiki/Demirchyan

Surnames

ru:Саакян